BBC Two of the British Broadcasting Corporation is a television network in the United Kingdom.

BBC2 may also refer to:

 Banahaw Broadcasting Corporation or BBC2 in the Philippines.
 BBC Radio 2, British radio station of the British Broadcasting Corporation
 BBC II! (BBC Three Online), a British online service operating between the closure and revival of the BBC Three channel

See also

 
 BBC (disambiguation)